Classics is the ninth studio album by American singer Jennifer Rush. Having been classically trained as a singer years earlier, Rush went back to her roots in Classics and recorded a selection of her past hits with the Hungarian Philharmonic Orchestra. These were vast reworkings of the songs, where many had been originally uptempo pop tunes were now slow and dramatic works, such as "Ring of Ice" and "I Come Undone". As well as these, four new songs were included on the collection, including lead single "The End of a Journey". 

The album was released in several European countries, reaching number 34 on the German Albums Chart. The re-recorded version of "Ring of Ice" was released a year later as a Promo-only single to coincide with her Classics tour. Rush undertook a tour with the Orchestra based on this album in 1999, which proved popular and appeared on several television shows with them, including on one occasion, in a duet with José Carreras. Classics remained Rush's last album for more than a decade, as she spent the next few years away from the business apart from occasional recordings on various soundtrack albums.

Track listing
All tracks produced by Leslie Mándoki.

Notes
 The Hungarian Edition includes a bonus track "Az Utazás Végén", a Hungarian version of "The End of a Journey".
 The Spanish Edition includes a Spanish version of "The Power of Love" titled "Si Tu Eres Mi Hombre", which is placed as the opening track on the album while the English version is placed as the final track (Track 13).

Charts

References

External links

1998 albums
Jennifer Rush albums
Virgin Records albums